Anastasiya Nychyporenko (born 28 January 1995) is a Ukrainian-born Moldovan biathlete.

Performances

External links
 Biathlon.com.ua
 IBU Datacenter

1995 births
Living people
Ukrainian female biathletes
Moldovan female biathletes
Ukrainian emigrants to Moldova
Naturalised citizens of Moldova
Sportspeople from Chernihiv Oblast